Mirachelus galapagensis is a species of sea snail, a marine gastropod mollusk in the family Chilodontidae.

Description
The height of the shell attains  3.5 mm.

Distribution
This species occurs in the Pacific Ocean off the Galapagos Islands and off Cocos Island, Costa Rica

References

External links
 To World Register of Marine Species
 

galapagensis
Gastropods described in 1970